Erythrae or Erythrai was a town in Ainis in ancient Thessaly. 

It is tentatively located near Phrantzi.

References

Populated places in ancient Thessaly
Former populated places in Greece
Ainis